Early general elections were held in Tuvalu on 25 November 1993, after the previous elections in September had resulted in a deadlock in Parliament, with supporters of incumbent and former Prime Ministers Bikenibeu Paeniu and Tomasi Puapua holding an equal number of seats.

As there were no political parties, all candidates for the twelve seats ran as independents. Following the elections, Puapua stepped aside and Kamuta Latasi was elected Prime Minister on 10 December, defeating Paeniu by seven votes to five. Otinielu Tausi became Deputy Prime Minister, while Tomasi Puapua was appointed Speaker.

While Naama Latasi was not re-elected in the September elections, she regained her seat in parliament in the November elections.

Results

References

Tuvalu
1993 11
1993 in Tuvalu
Non-partisan elections
November 1993 events in Oceania
1993